Celia Ireland (born 16 May 1966) is an Australian actress. She is best known for her role as Regina Butcher on the television series All Saints and her Logie award winning role as Liz Birdsworth on the prison drama series Wentworth.

Early life
Celia Ireland was born in Newcastle, New South Wales on 16 May 1966. She lived in Haig Street, Belmont, City of Lake Macquarie, New South Wales, Australia with a large cast of older sisters and a brother. Celia attended Saint Mary's Catholic High School, Gateshead, City of Lake Macquarie, New South Wales and later Saint Anne's/Saint Pius X College, Adamstown (Newcastle), New South Wales, Australia. Currently, she often visits Canberra, ACT and enjoys shopping and eating out.

Career
Ireland made her television debut in 1992 when she made a guest appearance on the Australian television series Police Rescue. What followed was a number of guesting roles on television series such as A Country Practice, Water Rats and Murder Call, to name but a few and the feature films Dallas Dolls in 1994, which was her film debut; Dad and Dave: On Our Selection, Floating Life, Idiot Box and Thank God He Met Lizzie, with Cate Blanchett; all of which she appeared in throughout the nineties.

In 1997, Ireland played Rosy's mother Filameena in the Australian children's television series Swinging for ABC TV.

In 1998, Ireland went on to voice Boronia in the Australian children's animated television series Petals for ABC TV and Mrs. Simms in the Australian children's animated television series Seaside Hotel for Seven Network and Yoram Gross EM TV in 2003.

In 1999, Ireland was cast as Regina Butcher on the Seven Network drama series All Saints, first appearing during the series' second season. She left the series in 2005 during season eight after the character of Regina was written out.

While appearing on All Saints, Ireland continued to receive guest roles in several series and films; the Australian feature films After the Rain, My Mother Frank, Angst and Australian Rules, in which she received a Film Critics Circle of Australia Award for Best Supporting Actress and was nominated for an Australian Film Institute Award for Best Actress in a Supporting Role; the popular Nine Network drama series McLeod's Daughters and Don't Blame Me. In 2006, Ireland played a recurring role in the second season of Supernova. Her other television credits include Monster House, Laid, Me and My Monsters, the television comedy-drama series Packed to the Rafters, and a recurring role as Connie Callahan in the Seven Network soap opera Home and Away; the films Rogue, Cactus, Being Venice and Goddess.

In 2012, Ireland received the regular role of Liz Birdsworth on Australian prison drama series Wentworth, a reimagining of the cult classic series Prisoner (Prisoner: Cell Block H) which aired on Network Ten from 1979 to 1986. Wentworth went to air on SoHo in mid-2013. Ireland had appeared as a regular in all three seasons, as a prisoner who gives peer support to her fellow inmates. Her character name is that of the original Prisoner character Lizzie Birdsworth, although Ireland plays a completely different character role to that of Sheila Florance's character, they do however share a similarity as Liz is a functioning alcoholic, Liz in season six of Wentworth would be diagnosed with Dementia..

Ireland would later exit the series in season 7, Liz would pass away after suffering a stroke after the devastating Siege of Wentworth. Ireland and Milosevic who were filming that scene at the time were not told that a costume sale that was being organized was suddenly cancelled as the show had secured funding for its final 20 episodes.

After leaving Wentworth Celia joined the filming of both the first seasons of Five Bedrooms and Total Control.

In 2022 Ireland joined several members of the Wentworth (TV series) cast at the Wentworth Con fan convention that was held in Melbourne., Celia also appeared at Wentworth Con Florida.

In 2022 it was announced that Ireland would join the Sydney Theatre Companies production of Hubris and Humiliation for its 2023 season.

Filmography

Awards and nominations

Notes

References

External links

Celia Ireland on Instagram
Celia Ireland at Sue Barnett and Associates 

1966 births
Actresses from New South Wales
Australian film actresses
Australian television actresses
Living people
Logie Award winners
People from Newcastle, New South Wales
20th-century Australian actresses
21st-century Australian actresses